Helen Berry Andelin (May 22, 1920 – June 7, 2009) was the founder of the Fascinating Womanhood Movement, beginning with the women's marriage classes she taught in the early 1960s. Controversial among feminists for its advice toward women's fulfilling traditional marriage roles, her writings are still supported and re-discovered as recently as 2016, with classes still being taught online and in seminars.

Biography

Early life 
The year 1920 saw the birth of Dr. Herbert and Mrs. Anna May Berry's seventh and last child, Helen Lucille, on the 22th day of May. The Berrys were a Latter-day Saint (LDS) family living in Mesa, Arizona. In her teens, Helen worked in a malt shop and at her parents' hotel. She graduated from Phoenix Union High School and attended Brigham Young University, where she majored in Home Economics.

Family 
At Brigham Young University, she met and married Aubrey Passey Andelin, son of Aubrey Olof and Gladys Passey Andelin. Aubrey graduated from the University of Southern California School of Dentistry and practiced dentistry in Central California for many years. The Andelins became the parents of eight children: four sons and four daughters.

Fascinating Womanhood 
Andelin wrote the book Fascinating Womanhood in 1963 to correspond with the marriage enrichment classes she taught in Central California. She sold approximately 300,000 copies from her garage through a publishing firm she and her husband founded, Pacific Press Santa Barbara.  She was inspired by a set of pamphlets that had been published in the 1920s for single girls: "Fascinating Womanhood." The classes started with an enrollment of eight women. Eventually it grew to where it taught and influenced tens of thousands of women of all races and religions worldwide with over 1,500 teachers.

Fascinating Womanhood spawned a grassroots movement. Going against the "second wave" feminist tide of the 1960s and beyond, the classes and book focused on women developing deeply romantic relationships with their husbands and securing stable homes.  The classes continue to this day in countries including the United States, Japan, Mexico, Brazil, South Africa, Saudi Arabia, United Kingdom, and the Philippines.

The first online Fascinating Womanhood class was held in 2000-2001 by a woman from Kansas, Mrs. Franky. Additional online teachers have served over the years.  Discussion groups exist on the Internet and in live venues.

Eventually reissued in several editions, Fascinating Womanhood (also known as "The Book the Feminists Love to Hate") has sold over five million copies worldwide, and has been translated into Spanish, French, Japanese, Korean, Portuguese, Czech, Polish and Russian. Random House issued the latest edition of the book in February 2007.

Andelin hosted a website on which she gave advice on marriage and motherhood.

Other books by Andelin include The Fascinating Girl, a book addressed to single women, which was originally published in 1969 and remained in print as of 2007; and All About Raising Children, published in 1980. Andelin also designed The Domestic Goddess Planning Notebook to help women keep their busy lives organized. She also wrote and produced student workbooks for both Fascinating Womanhood and The Fascinating Girl.

Andelin made many media appearances over the years. She was interviewed by Michael Douglas, Larry King, Phil Donahue, Hugh Downs, and Barbara Walters. She appeared in the March 10, 1975 issue of Time magazine, in an article called "Total Fascination".

Later life 
Andelin began her online presence in 1998.  It appeared that the death of her husband in 1999 took a significant emotional toll on her, causing a conspicuous absence from interaction with the public. However, she returned to the world of Fascinating Womanhood about a year later, convinced of the necessity of her message.

In 2006, the Helen B. Andelin Papers were donated to the University of Utah, where they remain housed in the Marriott Library Special Collections.

Andelin died at her daughter Virginia Leavitt's home on June 7, 2009, in Pierce City, Missouri. She was survived by eight children.

Fascinating Womanhood is now led by Helen Andelin's daughter, Dixie Andelin Forsyth. Dixie has written a sequel to her mother's book Fascinating Womanhood for the Timeless Woman, released in 2018. In addition, she has updated her mother's original books, as per her request before her death, with Vintage editions of each. Fascinating Womanhood continues today with an active presence on Facebook, YouTube, Instagram, and Twitter. The legacy of "home first" continues.

References

External links 
Official web page of the Fascinating Womanhood movement
 Helen B. Andelin Papers – University of Utah Marriott Library Special Collections

1920 births
2009 deaths
American self-help writers
Female critics of feminism
Brigham Young University alumni
Writers from Mesa, Arizona
20th-century American non-fiction writers
20th-century American women writers
Latter Day Saints from Arizona
Latter Day Saints from California
American women non-fiction writers